Southside of Bombay are a Māori band from New Zealand. They are best known for their single 'What's the Time, Mr Wolf?' which was originally released in 1992. The song was re-released following its appearance in the 1994 film and on the soundtrack of Once Were Warriors, after which it became second best selling New Zealand single that year.

The band took their name from the Bombay Hills in northern New Zealand. The hills are traditionally the boundary between Auckland city and the rest of the country, and to be from "south of the Bombays" colloquially means not to be from Auckland.

Discography

Albums

Singles

Compilation appearances

Awards

New Zealand Music Awards

1993 'Best Māori Recording' for "All Across the World"
1996 'Best Polynesian Recording' for "Umbadada"
1996 'Mana Māori Award' for "Kia Mau"
1996 'Mana Reo Award' for "Kia Mau"
1999 'Mana Maori Award' for "Live in Aotearoa"

References

Māori music
New Zealand musical groups
Māori-language singers